USS S-25 (SS-130) was a first-group (S-1 or "Holland") S-class submarine of the United States Navy.

Construction and commissioning
S-25 was laid down on 26 October 1918 by the Fore River Shipbuilding Corporation in Quincy, Massachusetts.  She was launched on 29 May 1922. sponsored by Mrs. Vera Hobart Schlabach, wife of  Ross P. Schlabach, USN, and commissioned on 9 July 1923.

Service history

U.S. Navy
Operating New London, Connecticut, in 1923, S-25 participated in winter maneuvers in the Caribbean Sea and the Panama Canal Zone area from January to April 1924. Then transferred to the United States West Coast, she operated primarily in the waters off Southern California until 1931. Fleet Problems and division exercises during that period took her back to the  Panama Canal area from March to May 1927, to Hawaii in 1927 and 1928, to the Panama Canal area again in February 1929, and to Hawaii again  in 1930.

Transferred again, S-25 departed San Diego, California, on 15 April 1931 and arrived at Pearl Harbor, Hawaii, on 25 April 1931. She operated in Hawaiian waters until 1939.

S-25 cleared Pearl Harbor to return to the United States East Coast on 16 June 1939 and arrived at New London on 25 August 1939. Voyage repairs followed, and in February 1940 she was assigned to a test and evaluation division at New London. In December 1940 she was detached and ordered to Key West, Florida, where she provided training services until May 1941. She then returned to New London to prepare for transfer to the United Kingdom under the terms of the Lend-Lease agreement. She was decommissioned on 4 November 1941.

Royal Navy
On the day of her decommissioning, S-25 was transferred to the United Kingdom, which renamed her HMS P.551. Later the same day, however, the Royal Navy loaned her to the Polish Navy.

Polish Navy

Polish Navy Lieutenant Commander Bolesław Romanowski accepted P.551 on behalf of the Polish government-in-exile. The Polish Navy commissioned her immediately as ORP Jastrząb for World War II service.

References 

United States S-class submarines
Ships built in Quincy, Massachusetts
1922 ships
Ships transferred from the United States Navy to the Royal Navy
Ships transferred from the United States Navy to the Polish Navy
Maritime incidents in May 1942
Friendly fire incidents of World War II